Philonicus albiceps is a species of 'robber fly' belonging to the family Asilidae. It is a Palearctic species with a limited distribution in Europe

Description 
Philonicus albiceps is light yellowish grey, often with darker markings. The legs are black. It has a scutellum with two pale marginal bristles and an ovipositor with a circlet of short spines".

Biology
The habitat is coastal sand dunes, sitting on bare sand among marram (more rarely at sandy places inland). Prey species include other dipteran species, including smaller asilids, Hymenoptera and Odonata.

References

Asilidae
Insects described in 1820
Brachyceran flies of Europe